Amina Benkhadra (born 28 November 1954 in Salé, Morocco) is a Moroccan politician of the National Rally of Independents party. Between 2007 and 2012, she held the position of minister of Energy and Mines in the cabinet of Abbas el Fassi.

References

Living people
Government ministers of Morocco
People from Salé
1954 births
Moroccan engineers
Moroccan chief executives
National Rally of Independents politicians
Alumni of Lycée Descartes (Rabat)